Minamishiio Choseichi  is a rockfill dam located in Ibaraki Prefecture in Japan. The dam is used for irrigation. The catchment area of the dam is 1.3 km2. The dam impounds about 12  ha of land when full and can store 560 thousand cubic meters of water. The construction of the dam was started on 1983 and completed in 1991.

See also
List of dams in Japan

References

Dams in Ibaraki Prefecture